The Jukola Boardinghouse is a former boarding house in Virginia, Minnesota, United States.  It was built in 1912, one of many constructed as mining began in the Iron Range and thousands of unmarried men arrived to take work.  In 1982 the Jukola Boardinghouse was listed on the National Register of Historic Places for its local significance in the themes of architecture, exploration/settlement, and social history.  It was nominated as a well-preserved example of this once-common and essential lodging option in the early years of Iron Range mining.

See also
 National Register of Historic Places listings in St. Louis County, Minnesota

References

1912 establishments in Minnesota
Buildings and structures in Virginia, Minnesota
National Register of Historic Places in St. Louis County, Minnesota
Residential buildings on the National Register of Historic Places in Minnesota